The Steam Awards are an annual user-voted award event for video games published on Valve's Steam service. Introduced in 2016, game nomination and voting periods are concurrent with Steam's annual autumn and winter holiday sales, centered around the holidays of Thanksgiving and Christmas.

Format
The Steam Awards are selected in two phases. In the first phase, Valve selects a number of categories, atypical of those used in gaming awards, and allows any registered Steam user to select one game available on Steam for that category. Valve subsequently reviews the nominations and then selects the top five games for final voting. These nominations are then presented to Steam users, giving them the opportunity to vote in each category. Following this, Valve announces the winners. Game nomination and voting periods are concurrent with Steam's annual autumn and winter holiday sales, centered around the holidays of Thanksgiving and Christmas.

Awards

2016
The nomination process took place from November 23–29, 2016. The voting took place from December 22–30, 2016, with the winners announced on December 31. The awards received around 15 million nominations.

2017
The nomination process took place from November 22–28, 2017. The voting took place from December 20, 2017, to January 2, 2018, with the winners announced on January 3.

2018
The nomination process began on November 21, 2018. Finalists were revealed in December, with the winners announced during a live broadcast on Steam.tv on February 8, 2019.

2019
The nomination process began on November 26, 2019. Finalists were revealed starting on December 11, 2019, with one category a day. Unlike previous years, eligibility for awards was restricted by release date, with only games released after November 2018 able to be nominated, except for the "Labor of Love" category. Users were able to vote from December 19–31, with the winners announced on the final day.

2020
The nomination process began on November 25, 2020, with winners announced on January 3, 2021. Nominees for each category were announced daily starting on December 17, 2020, with voting commencing between December 22 and January 3.

2021
Nominees were announced on December 22, 2021, with voting commencing until January 3, 2022.

2022
The nomination process took place from November 22–29, 2022. Nominees were announced on December 18, 2022, with the voting process taking place from December 22–29 while the winners were announced on January 3, 2023.

References

External links

Awards established in 2016
Awards
Video game awards
Annual events